Abubakar Tafawa Balewa University Teaching Hospital is a federal government of Nigeria teaching hospital located in Bauchi, Bauchi State, Nigeria. The current chief medical director is Yusuf Bara Jibril.


History 
Abubakar Tafawa Balewa University Teaching Hospital, was established in 2010. The hospital was formerly known as Specialist Hospital, Bauchi.

CMD 
The current chief medical director is Yusuf Bara Jibril.

References 

University of Nigeria
Teaching hospitals in Nigeria
2010 establishments in Nigeria